Maurice Moisset (1860–1946) was a French marine and landscape painter. Maurice Moisset was a pupil of Jules Lefebvre and Dameron, and member of the Society of French Artists since 1888.

In 1924 he was appointed Peintre Officiel de la Marine (POM), which is the official designation of a marine painter of the French Navy with the rank of a naval officer.

From 1942 to 1946 he was the president of Foundation Taylor, a French association of painters, architects and other artists.

Paintings 

Moisset painted many different landscapes, but was especially drawn towards the light before and after sunset.

https://web.archive.org/web/20120417114254/http://www.netmarine.net/tradi/pom/textes/listepomdcd.pdf
http://www.taylor.fr/accPresentation.php

Literature:
https://books.google.dk/books/about/Atelier_du_peintre_Maurice_Moisset_2e_ve.html?id=T2zPMgAACAAJ&redir_esc=y

1860 births
1946 deaths
19th-century French painters
20th-century French painters
20th-century French male artists
French male painters
French landscape painters
French marine artists
19th-century French male artists